The Big Show is a 1926 American silent drama film directed by George Terwilliger and starring John Lowell, Evangeline Russell and Jane Thomas. It is set in a travelling circus show, where a stranger joins the show and becomes a star attraction. He ends up crossing swords with a millionaire who had swindled him out his share in some oil lands during World War I.

Cast
 John Lowell as Bill
 Evangeline Russell as 	Ruth Gordon
 F. Serrano Keating as Norman Brackett
 Jane Thomas as Marian Kearney
 Joseph Miller as Col Jim Kearney 
 Dan Dix as Stumpy Dan
 Alice Lecacheur as Fifi
 Maida Blatherwick as Dolly
 Joe E. Lewis as Abie

References

Bibliography
 Munden, Kenneth White. The American Film Institute Catalog of Motion Pictures Produced in the United States, Part 1. University of California Press, 1997.

External links
 

1926 films
1926 drama films
1920s English-language films
American silent feature films
Silent American drama films
American black-and-white films
Films directed by George Terwilliger
Associated Exhibitors films
1920s American films